The Women's scratch was held on 17 October 2014.

Results

References

Women's scratch
European Track Championships – Women's scratch